Ain Al-Tamur District is a district of Karbala Governorate, central Iraq. Its population is 100% Shia.

References

Districts of Karbala Province